General Harvey may refer to:

Celia Harvey (born c. 1962), British Army major general
Charles Harvey (Indian Army officer) (1888–1969), British Indian Army major general
Daniel Harvey (British Army officer) (c. 1664–1732), British Army general
Edward Harvey (British Army officer)y (1718–1778), British Army lieutenant general
Frederick Maurice Watson Harvey (1888–1980), Canadian Expeditionary Force brigadier general
John Harvey (British Army officer) (1778–1852), British Army lieutenant general
William Edwin Harvey (United States Army officer) (1871–1922), U.S. Army brigadier general